Reenu-Rew (Wolof for 'Roots of the Nation') was a radical Marxist group in Senegal, founded in 1973 by Landing Savané. It published Xarébi (Struggle). In 1974 Reenu-Rew stood behind the initiative to form And-Jëf.

Sources
Zuccarelli, François. La vie politique sénégalaise (1940-1988). Paris: CHEAM, 1988.

Political parties in Senegal
Communist parties in Senegal
Political parties established in 1973